The jambandu indigobird (Vidua raricola) is a species of bird in the family Viduidae. It is also known as the goldbreast indigobird.
It is found in Benin, Burkina Faso, Cameroon, Central African Republic, Ghana, Guinea, Ivory Coast, Liberia, Nigeria, Sierra Leone, South Sudan and Togo. Its habitat is savannah and brush.

References

Jambandu indigobird
Birds of West Africa
Birds of Sub-Saharan Africa
Jambandu indigobird
Taxonomy articles created by Polbot